Sven Chris Gartner (born July 12, 1950) is a Swedish former American football kicker who played one season for the Cleveland Browns of the National Football League (NFL). He went to college at Indiana.

Early life and education
Chris Gartner was born on July 12, 1950, in Gothenburg, Sweden. He is one of only 9 Swedish NFL players. He went to high school in Princeton, New Jersey, and attended college at the University of Indiana. He played for their football team, the Hoosiers, and was inducted into the school's Hall of Fame in 2019. In his senior year, 1972, he was named first-team All-America and first-team All-Big Ten after setting school records for single-season scores (14), field goals in a game (4), and longest field goal (52 yards). In a 34 to 35 win against Kentucky, he became the only IU player to ever have two 50+ yard field goals in a game.

Professional career
He was first signed as an undrafted free agent by the Dallas Cowboys in 1973, but was released in July. 

In 1974, he was signed by the Cleveland Browns as a second kicker to handle kickoff duties. He played there for 11 games. Gartner was released shortly before the start of the '75 season.

References

Further reading
 
 

1950 births
Living people
Sportspeople from Gothenburg
Swedish players of American football
American football placekickers
Princeton High School (New Jersey) alumni
Indiana Hoosiers football players
Cleveland Browns players